The President's Export Council is an American government organization that serves as the principal national advisory committee on international trade. The Council advises the President of government policies and programs that affect U.S. trade performance; promotes export expansion; and provides a forum for discussing and resolving trade-related problems among the business, industrial, agricultural, labor, and government sectors. The Council reports to the President through the Secretary of Commerce. The Under Secretary of Commerce for International Trade serves as the Council's Executive Director.

The President's Export Council was created by Executive Order on December 20, 1973. The twenty-eight private-sector members of the Council are appointed by the President. They serve, "at the pleasure of the President," with no set term of office. Five United States Senators and five members of the House of Representatives are appointed to the Council by the President of the Senate and the Speaker of the House, respectively. The Secretaries of Commerce, Labor, Agriculture, Treasury, State, and Homeland Security; the Chairman of the Export-Import Bank of the United States; the U.S. Trade Representative; and the Administrator of the Small Business Administration are also members of the Council.

See also

United States Department of Commerce

References

External links
 Official website

United States Department of Commerce
United States national commissions
Organizations established in 1973
1973 establishments in the United States